Karen Grude Koht (16 November 1871– 10 July 1960) was a Norwegian educationalist, essayist and feminist pioneer.

Biography
She was born at Høyland in Rogaland, Norway. She was the daughter of Martin Adolf Grude (1841-1918) and Anna Karoline Mossige (1849-1910).
In 1893 she traveled to Kristiania (now Oslo) to attend  Ragna Nielsens skole.  In 1896, she passed the teacher's test 
and started her working career as a teacher in Sandnes. She taught from 1911 at the State School of Education at Stabekk, from 1920 at  social courses offer through the Norwegian National Women's Council and from 1923 at  Den kvinnelige industriskole  in Oslo. She was also a deputy member of Bærum municipal council and was a member of the Bærum school board 1918-24.

The Norwegian National Women's Council (Norske Kvinners Nasjonalråd) was founded in 1904 as an umbrella organization for the various Norwegian women's associations. She served as a member of the organization together with fellow rights activists  Betzy Kjelsberg, Fredrikke Marie Qvam, Gina Krog and Katti Anker Møller.

She was a diligent writer in newspapers and magazines, in addition to translating books into Norwegian.
Among her works are ABC. Mi fyrste bok from 1921 and Regler og rim for barn from 1923.
In 1937, she completed  Pedagogisk psykologi together with her daughter, Åse Gruda Skard.

Personal life
In 1898, she  married the noted historian Halvdan Koht. They were the parents of psychologist Åse Gruda Skard and diplomat Paul Koht. Their grandchildren include   Torild Skard, Målfrid Grude Flekkøy and Halvdan Skard. She died at Bærum during  1960 and was buried at Nordre gravlund in Oslo.

Selected works
Kvinnearbeid,  1908
Barna våre. Litt fra deres sjeleliv, 1929 
 Norske kvinners nasjonalråd 25 år, 1929
Farmor fortel for dei minste, 1960

References

Related reading
Agerholt, Anna Caspari (1973) Den norske kvinnebevegelses historie (Oslo: Gyldendal) 

1871 births
1960 deaths
People from Sandnes
Norwegian educators
Norwegian essayists
Norwegian feminists
Norwegian psychology writers
Norwegian women non-fiction writers
Bærum politicians
Liberal Party (Norway) politicians
Burials at Nordre gravlund
Norwegian Association for Women's Rights people